Abu Amir Abdallah ibn Ahmad was the Marinid Sultan of Morocco from 1396 to 1398.

Life 
Abdallah succeeded his brother Abu Faris Abdul Aziz II in 1396.  During his rule the state was effectively ruled by the vizier.
He was succeeded by his brother Abu Said Uthman III in 1398.

References
Citations

Sources

14th-century Berber people
14th-century monarchs in Africa
14th-century Moroccan people
People from Fez, Morocco
Marinid sultans of Morocco